Bobroedka is a pejorative nickname for Russian journalist and editor-in-chief of RT Margarita Simonyan, which has become an Internet meme in Russia and the post-Soviet countries.

History 
Margarita Simonyan got this nickname quite by accident. At the end of 2012, she went shopping at the market. In honor of the New Year 2013, Simonyan decided to try beaver, which she told her subscribers: "For the first time in my life I will cook beaver. Interviewed experts. As a result, I will cook a beaver's head with onions, carrots and lavrushka [bay leaf] for broth. The rest of the meat will be marinated overnight in garlic, juniper berries and black pepper, tomorrow I will fry and therefore I will stew in broth until soft". Users found such tastes specific, since the beaver is a non-common animal for eating.

After that, the nickname "bobroedka", which literally means "beaver-eater", was firmly fixed for Simonyan. Particularly angry subscribers began to make memes combining images of Margarita and beaver. The nickname was very often used by opposition leader Alexei Navalny and his fans, often in a negative context. For example, after Simonyan's message about eating a beaver, Navalny posted a photo of the animal on Twitter and made a pretentious statement: "Most recently, he was eating grass and enjoying life. And tomorrow Margarita Simonyan will devour him with vodka".

In October 2019, Simonyan responded to Navalny's accusation, in which he called journalists Maria Baronova and Olesya Ryabtseva "pigbums", adding that the "bobroedka" from the Navalny's mouth sounds much more metaphorical.

Navalny also trolled Simonyan with this nickname in February 2021, when the veteran's libel case was being considered in court. Navalny, who was connected with the court, didn't see who lives in the apartment of the offended pensioner, and asked for clarification: "I would like to understand who is sitting there, is it an investigator? Is Margarita Simonyan eating beaver?". In response to this, Anton Krasovsky and Simonyan stated that "no one behaves like that".

In April 2021, Simonyan sent beaver meat to the colony to the starving Navalny. She wrote "Navalny is on a hunger strike. Just in time, I sent him a yummy package," posting photos of packages of beaver sausage and its smoked meat on social networks. In social networks, her act caused sharp criticism.

Simonyan doesn't particularly like her nickname, although she sometimes used it in her posts. Simonyan believes that the nickname "bobroedka" is hopelessly outdated.

References 

Political slurs for people
Internet memes introduced in 2012
Political Internet memes
Alexei Navalny
Internet memes introduced from Russia